National Ethnographic Museum is the national ethnographic museum of Guinea-Bissau. It is situated in Bissau, and is one of two major museums in the country. As of 1998 it had a library of 14,000 volumes.

References

Buildings and structures in Bissau
Museums in Guinea-Bissau
Ethnographic museums in Africa
National museums